Comics is a two-part British television miniseries, written and created by Lynda La Plante, that broadcast on Channel 4 in June 1993. Adapted from La Plante's novel of the same name, the series stars Tim Guinee as Johnny Lazar, a down-and-out American comedian who tries to regain his status as an international superstar by embarking on a tour of working men's clubs and universities in England. But on his first night, Johnny is witness to a gangland murder and finds himself having to go on the run as he becomes the target of hit men who want to eliminate any chance of them being identified.

The series also stars Danny Webb as Lazar's agent, Brian Duffield; Lennie James as Delroy Smith, a local delinquent whom the police suspect committed the murder; and Michelle Fairley as Nula O'Reilly, Duffield's girlfriend and a fellow comic who grows close to Johnny. The series was directed by Diarmuid Lawrence, produced by Verity Lambert via her own production company, Cinema Verity, and features a number of notable cameo appearances, including the likes of Michael Aspel and The Wildhearts. Comic material used in the series was co-written by Jenny Eclair. The complete series was released on DVD via Simply Media on 21 May 2018.

Cast
 Tim Guinee as Johnny Lazar
 Danny Webb as Brian Duffield 
 Lennie James as Delroy Smith 
 Michelle Fairley as Nula O'Reilly 
 Frank Grimes as D.C.I. Kelly 
 Christopher Fulford as Nigel Perfect
 Graham Fellows as Graham Redcar 
 Jenny Galloway as Rebecca 
 Alex Norton as Haggis 
 Terry O'Neill	as Peter Moreno
 Stephen Greif as Anthony Fratelli 
 Joe Dixon as Harper Knowles 
 Steve Nicolson as D.I. Cloaks 
 Colin Wyatt as D.I. Shawley 
 Johanna Benyon as Felix 
 Lou Hirsch as Morris Feldman
 Michael Gardiner as Supt. Jackson
 Cassandra Holliday as Lucinda
 Richard Ridings as Tommy Karr 
 Kevin Williams as Alex Cornwall

Episodes

Releases

Comics has been released on DVD in 2018 by Simply Media.

References

External links

1993 British television series debuts
1993 British television series endings
1990s British drama television series
1990s British crime television series
Channel 4 crime television shows
Channel 4 television dramas
Channel 4 miniseries
Television series produced at Pinewood Studios
English-language television shows
Television shows set in the United Kingdom